Wandisile Letlabika (born 2 August 1989) is a South African professional soccer player who plays for Moroka Swallows in the South African Premier Division.

Honours
Mamelodi Sundowns
Runner-up
 Nedbank Cup: 2012–13
 Telkom Knockout: 2012
Bloemfontein Celtic
Runner-up
 Nedbank Cup: 2019–20
 Telkom Knockout: 2017

Source:

References

1989 births
Living people
South African soccer players
People from Aliwal North
Association football defenders
Mamelodi Sundowns F.C. players
Bloemfontein Celtic F.C. players
Moroka Swallows F.C. players
South African Premier Division players
South Africa international soccer players
Soccer players from the Eastern Cape